The Sword of the Spirit is an international, ecumenical association of Christian communities within the charismatic movement. The member communities are composed predominantly of laypersons. It takes its roots from the Shepherding movement. The Sword of the Spirit has 65 member communities across 24 countries, and approximately 10,000 total members.

History 
The Sword of the Spirit was founded by Ralph Martin and Steve Clark in 1982. Clark was born in 1940, and studied at Yale University, the University of Freiburg, and the University of Notre Dame. He worked with Ralph Martin as an early leader of the Charismatic Movement in Michigan, publishing several books on charismatic spirituality and Christian community building, many through the Sword of the Spirit self-publication Servant Publications (often Servant Books).

The Sword of the Spirit developed as the umbrella network centred around the Word of God (community) in Ann Arbor, Michigan, where it was a prolific organisation amongst the initial charismatic covenant community organisations such as People of Praise and Mother of God Community.

Notable member communities

Word of God 
The initial federation of Sword of the Spirit communities included the Word of God community in Ann Arbor, Michigan.

In 1990, the Word of God disaffiliated with the Sword of the Spirit following an investigation into abuses within the community by Bishop Albert Ottenweller.

Founders Steve Clark and Ralph Martin split, Martin remaining with Word of God, and Clark remaining with Sword of the Spirit. Following the disaffiliation, Martin said that the Sword of the Spirit training course was "an ill-advised venture that led to considerable confusion, turmoil, spiritual distress both in individuals and in the community as a body," "fostered elitism," "attempted to build a comprehensive Christian culture by fiat," was especially harmful to women and "had a negative impact on many marriages and placed undue stress on many families." The split from Word of God saw 15 further communities leave the Sword of the Spirit.

The Word of God community has traditionally implemented a hierarchical structure, where male 'leaders' within the group were in charge of male community members' decisions "down to minor family matters", and female community members were similarly subject to relevant male household heads.

People of Praise (US) 
The Sword of the Spirit historically devolves from an initial 'association of communities' created by the Word of God (community) and the People of Praise. In 1981 the association was disbanded due to lack of agreement between leadership of the two groups, prompting the founding of the Sword of the Spirit to act as a replacement association of communities centred around the Word of God community. People of Praise have not been affiliated with the Sword of the Spirit since 1981.

Servants of Christ the King 
The Servants of Christ the King community, Ohio, led by Sword of the Spirit senior coordinator Father Michael Scanlan  was among the initial federation of Sword of the Spirit communities.

The Servants of Christ the King disaffiliated from the Sword of the Spirit in 1991 under the orders of Bishop Ottenweller, following findings that the Sword of the Spirit influence was controlling, elitist, secretive, fundamentalist, and intruded on family life.

Servant of Christ the King leader, and Sword of the Spirit senior coordinator, Father Michael Scanlan (priest), was involved in a sex abuse scandal at the Franciscan University of Steubenville, Ohio, where he presided as president of the institution. A revelation came about in late 2018 that a former chaplain at Franciscan of Steubenville, Father Sam Tiesi, had engaged in years-long abuse of women at the university. It has been reported by multiple victims that they made Father Scanlan aware but he did nothing or, in at least one case, verbally assaulted the accuser. Instead of dealing with the abuse he participated in covering up and silencing those who would report his close friend, Father Tiesi.

Alongside Tiesi and Scanlan, a third Servants of Christ the King member is noted as involved in this sex abuse scandal: televangelist John Bertolucci, who is noted as having multiple previous sex abuse allegations, and was dismissed by the Diocese of Albany in 2002 following previous admission of paedophilia and other abuse of minors by Bertolucci. John Bertolucci was also involved in Sword of the Spirit leadership, where he headed FIRE, a Catholic Sword of the Spirit branch.

People of Hope 
The People of Hope became affiliated with the Sword of the Spirit in 1983. In 1986, the Archbishop of Newark, Peter L. Gerty, ordered the People of Hope community to end their affiliation with the Sword of the Spirit. Rev. Philipp Rotunno, liaison for charismatic renewal, stated the Sword of the Spirit believed they were "fighting an Empire of Evil". Previous membership of the People of Hope have made claims that leadership thought they were "anointed by god", exerted excessive control over community members, and enforced the subservient role of women, dubbed "handmaidens", in the community.

The People of Hope remained an unrecognised Catholic lay community until 2007 on the grounds of complaints of "abuse, mind control, elitist behaviour and cult-like controls" from ex-members of the group. Archbishop Theodore McCarrick issued a public letter declaring that a school operated by the People of Hope, Koinonia Academy, “is not an approved Catholic school and it is not recommended for Catholic parents as a place where their children can receive Catholic education as supervised by the Church.” In 2007 Archbishop John Myers recognised the People of Hope as an official lay community of the Catholic church, saying the Archdiocese of Newark was satisfied that the People of Hope had made the changes demanded by previous investigation from officials of the Catholic church.

In Popular Culture 
Margaret Atwood states that the People of Hope, while a member of Sword of the Spirit in 1985, were inspiration for the book The Handmaid's Tale. Specifically Atwood calls the People of Hope a "cult" and refers to this group as inspiration due to the claims of the subjugation of women, isolationist nature, and practices of indoctrination observed within the group.

People of Praise (India) 
Current affiliated Sword of the Spirit covenant communities include the People of Praise in Bangalore, India, distinct from the now disaffiliated People of Praise in the United States.

Servants of the Word 
The Servants of the Word is an ecumenical Sword of the Spirit community of men. The men are committed to serving within other Sword of the Spirit communities.

Serious concerns were raised regarding Servants of the Word's child protection policy following the charging of Jamie Treadwell for sexual abuse of children while a member of Servants of the Word, where it became apparent that Servants of the Word leadership had been aware of similar allegations which had been reported to authorities regarding Treadwell and other Servants of the Word members for at least ten years.

Youth outreach

Kairos 

Kairos is a Sword of the Spirit youth outreach programme which aims to convert participants, encourage participants to engage with Sword of the Spirit member communities, and to educate participants to follow Sword of the Spirit doctrine.

NET Ministries 
NET Ministries youth outreach was developed around the member community 'Christ the Redeemer' where community coordinator Jim Kolar is on the NET board of directors. NET Ministries retains strong affiliation with Sword of the Spirit.

Description

Religious practices 
Religious practice within the Sword of the Spirit and other covenant communities within the Charismatic Christianity movement include a range of practices from Pentacostalism. These practices have historically included Exorcism and Demonology, Speaking in tongues, Spiritual gifts (or 'charisms'), Faith Healing and Prophecy.

Finances 
The Sword of the Spirit finances its operations primarily through tithing, where community members are required to pay a percentage of their income to the community treasury.
Sword of the Spirit USA tax returns show a yearly revenue of around $1.5 million, with just under $1 million paid out in wages and salary, with a workforce of just under 30 employees.

Gender roles 
Gender roles within Sword of the Spirit communities have followed a conservative model of gender roles with patriarchal values, where males maintain headship over females within the communities. A Sword of the Spirit motto for woman is given as "make a space", while the motto for men is given as "Seize the territory"

Islam, feminism, homosexuality and communism 
Sword of the Spirit leader, Steven Clark, has presented a training course for disciples of the Sword of the Spirit, in which Clark identifies "global threats" which endanger the Sword of the Spirit mission to "build the Kingdom of God". These four key opponents of Clark's model for Christianity are identified as "Islam, communism, feminism and gay rights".

Reception 

The Sword of the Spirit member communities have been subject to several interventions from local bishops of the catholic church throughout the organisation's history  following concerns from members of the communities that community leaders were "attempting to strictly control relationships and finances, and representing that control as the will of God."

Academic study 
Following the split between the Word of God community and the Sword of the Spirit some academic study was conducted at the Word of God community investigating the moral reasoning of children within the community, and analysing the capacity of the covenant community model presented by the Sword of the Spirit to transfer religion to a new generation. Csordas finds that young children "equate the conventional order of social life with the moral order of spiritual life" whereas teenagers are "often vehemently opposed to and critical of community ideology and its practices of enforcement", and proposes that such cultures may take 3 generations to stabilise.

Ex-People of Praise Catholic Theologist Dr. Adrian J Reimers has rebuked the covenant community design propagated by the Sword of the Spirt, noting that the organisation is cult-like, claiming that the covenant community model represents "powerful means of psychological and social control", and that covenant communities such as those in Sword of the Spirit present a "world in which a person loses psychological control of his or her own life".

Notable members 
 Anton Colella
 Michael Scanlan (priest) (former member)
 Jamie Treadwell ( former member)
 Ed Conlin

See also 
 Emmanuel Community

References

External links 
 The Sword of the Spirit
 The Servants of the Word

Nondenominational Christian societies and communities
Ecumenical councils